Glenn David Starkmann (born 7 November 1962) is a Canadian physicist and professor at Case Western Reserve University. He was awarded with the Status of Fellow in the American Physical Society, after being nominated by their Division of Astrophysics in 2005, for "his wide-ranging and creative contributions to particle astrophysics, including explorations of the possibility of non-trivial topology in the universe, and uncovering unexpected features in the cosmic microwave background fluctuations at large angular scales."

References 

Living people
1962 births
Scientists from Toronto
Canadian physicists
Fellows of the American Physical Society
Case Western Reserve University faculty
21st-century American physicists
University of Toronto alumni
Stanford University alumni